Peremilovo is a rural locality (a village) in Mardengskoye Rural Settlement, Velikoustyugsky District, Vologda Oblast, Russia. The population was 11 as of 2002. There is 1 street.

Geography 
Gruznishchevo is the nearest rural locality.

References 

Rural localities in Velikoustyugsky District